Adaptive cruise control (ACC) is an available cruise control advanced driver-assistance system for road vehicles that automatically adjusts the vehicle speed to maintain a safe distance from vehicles ahead. As of 2019, it is also called by 20 unique names that describe that basic functionality. This is also known as Dynamic cruise control.

Control is based on sensor information from  sensors. Such systems may use a radar or laser sensor or a camera setup allowing the vehicle to brake when it detects the car is approaching another vehicle ahead, then accelerate when traffic allows it to.

ACC technology is regarded as a key component of future generations of intelligent cars. The technology enhances passenger safety and convenience as well as increasing road capacity by maintaining optimal separation between vehicles and reducing driver errors. Vehicles with autonomous cruise control are considered a Level 1 autonomous car, as defined by SAE International. When combined with another driver assist feature such as lane centering, the vehicle is considered a Level 2 autonomous car.

Adaptive cruise control does not provide full autonomy: the system only provides some help to the driver, but does not drive the car by itself.

History 

 1992: Mitsubishi was the first to offer a lidar-based distance detection system on the Japanese market called Debonair. Marketed as "distance warning", this system warns the driver, without influencing throttle, brakes, or gearshifting.
 1995: Mitsubishi Diamante introduced laser "Preview Distance Control". This system controlled speed through throttle control and downshifting, not by applying the brakes.
 1997: Toyota offered a "laser adaptive cruise control" (lidar) system on the Japanese market Celsior. It controlled speed through throttle control and downshifting, not by applying the brakes.
 1999: Mercedes introduced "Distronic", the first radar-assisted ACC, on the Mercedes-Benz S-Class (W220) and the CL-Class.
 1999: Jaguar began offering a radar-based ACC system on the Jaguar XK (X100).
 1999: Nissan introduced laser ACC on the Japanese market Nissan Cima.
 1999: Subaru introduced world's first camera-based ACC on the Japanese-market Subaru Legacy Lancaster.
 2000: BMW introduced radar "Active Cruise Control" in Europe on the BMW 7 Series - E38.
 2000: Toyota was the first to bring laser ACC to the US market in late 2000, with the LS 430 Dynamic Laser Cruise Control system.
 2000: Toyota's laser ACC system added "brake control", that also applies brakes.
 2001: Infiniti introduced laser "Intelligent Cruise Control" on the 2002 Infiniti Q45 Third generation F50 and 2002 Infiniti QX4.
 2001: Renault introduced ACC on the Renault Vel Satis (supplied by Bosch)
 2002: Lancia introduced radar ACC (by Bosch) on the Lancia Thesis
 2002: Volkswagen introduced radar ACC, manufactured by Autocruise (now TRW), on the Volkswagen Phaeton.
 2002: Audi introduced radar ACC (Autocruise) on the Audi A8 in late 2002
 2003: Cadillac introduced radar ACC on the Cadillac XLR.
 2003: Toyota shifted from laser to radar ACC on the Celsior. The first Lexus Dynamic Radar Cruise Control and a radar-guided pre-collision system appeared on the Lexus LS (XF30) US market facelift.
 2004: Toyota added "low-speed tracking mode" to the radar ACC on the Crown Majesta. The low-speed speed tracking mode was a second mode that would warn the driver and provide braking if the car ahead stopped; it could stop the car, but would then deactivate.
 2005: In the United States, Acura introduced radar ACC integrated with a Collision avoidance system (Collision Mitigation Braking System (CMBS)) in the model year 2006 Acura RL.
 2005: Mercedes-Benz S-Class (W221) upgraded ACC to completely halt the car if necessary (now called "Distronic Plus" on E-Class and most Mercedes sedans.
It supported additional functions AWV1 and AWV2 to prevent collisions by using the brake system.
 2006: Audi introduced full speed range ACC plus on the Audi Q7. In low-speed mode, it warns the driver of a potential collision and prepares emergency braking as needed. The system was supplied by Bosch.
 2006: Nissan introduced "Intelligent Cruise Control with Distance Control Assist" on Nissan Fuga. It pushes the gas pedal against the foot when the navigation system observes an unsafe speed. If the Autonomous cruise control system is used, the Distance Control Assistance reduced speed automatically and warned the driver with an audible bell sound.
 2006: September 2006 Toyota introduced its "all-speed tracking function" for the Lexus LS 460.
 2007: BMW introduced full-speed Active Cruise Control Stop-and-Go on the BMW 5 Series (E60).
 2008: Lincoln introduced radar ACC on the 2009 Lincoln MKS.
 2008: SsangYong Motor Company introduced radar "Active Cruise Control" on the SsangYong Chairman
 2008: Volkswagen Passat CC, B6 and Touareg GP. The ACC system was updated to support a full auto stop and added Front Assist function to prevent collisions working separately of ACC. Front Assist cannot brake automatically, it only increases the pressure in the brake system and warns the driver.
 2008: Volkswagen Golf 6 introduced ACC with lidar.
 2009: Hyundai introduced radar ACC on Hyundai Equus in Korean market.
 2009: ACC and CMBS also became available as optional feature for the 2010 Acura MDX Mid Model Change (MMC) and the newly introduced model year 2010 Acura ZDX.
2010: Ford debuted its first ACC on the sixth generation Ford Taurus (option on most models, standard on the SHO)
 2010: Audi introduced a GPS-guided radar ACC on Audi A8#D4
 2010: Volkswagen Passat B7, CC. Update of ACC and updated Front Assist. Introduced emergency braking, named "City". The car could brake automatically to prevent a collision.
 2010: Jeep introduced ACC on the 2011 Jeep Grand Cherokee
 2012: Volkswagen made ACC standard on the Volkswagen Golf MK7 SE and above. 
 2013: Mercedes introduced "Distronic Plus with Steering Assist" (traffic jam assist) on the Mercedes-Benz S-Class (W222)
 2013: BMW introduced Active Cruise Control with Traffic Jam Assistant.
 2014: Chrysler introduced full speed range radar "Adaptive Cruise Control with Stop+" on the 2015 Chrysler 200.
 2014: Tesla introduced autopilot feature to Model S cars, enabling semi-autonomous cruise control.
 2015: Ford introduced the first pickup truck with ACC on the 2015 Ford F150.
 2015: Honda introduced its European CR-V 2015 with predictive cruise control.
2015: Volvo began offering ACC on all its models.
 2017: Cadillac introduced its Super Cruise semi-autonomous feature in the model year 2018 CT6 (for cars produced on or after 6 September 2017). The system used onboard radar and cameras along with lidar mapping data, allowing the driver to go hands-free on limited-access highways.
 2017: Toyota introduced its safety sense on all models as a standard feature. Toyota Safety Sense P (TSS-P) includes DRCC (dynamic radar cruise control) that uses a front-grille-mounted radar and a forward-facing camera that is designed to detect a vehicle in front and automatically adjust the vehicle's speed to help maintain a pre-set distance behind a vehicle ahead.

Types 

Laser-based systems do not detect and track vehicles in adverse weather conditions nor do they reliably track dirty (and therefore non-reflective) vehicles. Laser-based sensors must be exposed, the sensor (a fairly large black box) is typically found in the lower grille, offset to one side.

Radar-based sensors can be hidden behind plastic fascias; however, the fascias may look different from a vehicle without the feature. For example, Mercedes-Benz packages the radar behind the upper grille in the center and behind a solid plastic panel that has painted slats to simulate the look of the rest of the grille.

Single radar systems are the most common. Systems involving multiple sensors use either two similar hardware sensors like the 2010 Audi A8 or the 2010 Volkswagen Touareg, or one central long range radar coupled with two short radar sensors placed on the corners of the vehicle like the BMW 5 and 6 series.

A more recent development is the binocular computer vision system, such as that introduced to the US market in model year 2013 by Subaru. These systems have front-facing video cameras mounted on either side of the rearview mirror and use digital processing to extract depth information from the parallax between the two cameras' views.

Assisting systems 
Radar-based ACC is often sold together with a precrash system, which warns the driver and/or provides brake support if there is a high risk of a collision. Also in certain cars, it is incorporated with a lane maintaining system which provides a power steering assist to reduce steering input burden on corners when the cruise control system is activated.

Multi-sensor systems 
Systems with multiple sensors can practice sensor fusion to integrate the data to improve safety and/or driving experience. GPS data can inform the system of geographic features such as a freeway offramp. A camera system could notice driver behavior such as brake lights and/or a turn signal. This could allow the following car to interpret a turn signal by an exit as not requiring the following car to slow down, as the leading car will exit. Multi-sensor systems could also take note of traffic signs/signals and not, e.g., violate a red light while following a vehicle that crossed before the signal changed.

Predictive systems 
Predictive systems modify vehicle speed based on predictions of other vehicles' behavior. Such systems can make earlier, more moderate adjustments to the predicted behavior, improving safety and passenger comfort. One example is to predict the likelihood of a vehicle in a neighboring lane moving in front of the controlled vehicle. One system predicts a lane change up to five seconds before it occurs.

Regulations and norms
Adaptive cruise control is regulated by European norm ISO 15622 Intelligent transport systems — Adaptive cruise control systems — Performance requirements and test procedures.

According to this standard, an ACC is partial automation of longitudinal vehicle control to reduce the
workload of the driver on roads where non-motorized vehicles and pedestrians are prohibited. It does not deal with stationary objects.

According to this standard, ACC includes two classes of systems: the FSRA (full speed range) and the LSRA (limited speed range).

Vehicle models supporting adaptive cruise control 

The three main categories of ACC are: 
 Vehicles with Traffic Jam Assist / Stop & Go auto-resume from standstill to creep with stop and go traffic. 
 Vehicles with Partial cruise control cuts off and turns off below a set minimum speed, requiring driver intervention.
 Vehicles with fully automated speed control can respond to traffic signals and non-vehicular on-road activity.

Mercedes Distronic Plus 
In 1999, Mercedes introduced Distronic, the first radar-assisted adaptive system, on the Mercedes-Benz S-Class (W220) and the CL-Class. Distronic adjusts the vehicle speed automatically to the car in front in order to always maintain a safe distance to other cars on the road.

In 2005, Mercedes refined the system ("Distronic Plus") making the Mercedes-Benz S-Class (W221) the first car to receive the upgraded system. Distronic Plus could now completely halt the car if necessary on most sedans. In an episode of Top Gear, Jeremy Clarkson demonstrated the effectiveness of the system by coming to a complete halt from motorway speeds to a round-about and getting out, without touching the pedals.

In 2016, Mercedes introduced Active Brake Assist 4, the first emergency braking assistant with pedestrian recognition.

One crash caused by Distronic Plus dates to 2005, when German news magazine "Stern" was testing Mercedes' original Distronic system. During the test, the system did not always manage to brake in time. Ulrich Mellinghoff, then Head of Safety, NVH, and Testing at the Mercedes-Benz Technology Centre, stated that some tests failed because the vehicle was tested in a metallic hall, which caused problems with radar. Later iterations received an upgraded radar and other sensors, which are not disrupted by a metallic environment. In 2008, Mercedes conducted a study comparing the crash rates of Distronic Plus vehicles and vehicles without it, and concluded that those equipped with Distronic Plus have an around 20% lower crash rate.

See also 
 Autonomous car
 Cooperative Adaptive Cruise Control
 IEEE Intelligent Transportation Systems Society
 Intelligent car
 Lane centering
 Lane departure warning system
 Precrash system

References

External links 
Cooperative Adaptive Cruise Control: Human Factors Analysis—Federal Highway Administration

Advanced driver assistance systems
Automotive technology tradenames